Vassall may refer to: 
 Vassall (ward), a ward in the London Borough of Lambeth
 Vassall Tribunal, a public enquiry undertaken to investigate John Vassall's spying

People with the surname
 Elizabeth Vassall, later Baroness Holland
 John Vassall, British civil servant who spied for the Soviet Union
 Samuel Vassall (bapt. 1586–1667), English merchant and politician
 William Vassall (bapt. 1592–1657?), signatory to the Massachusetts Bay Charter

See also
 Henry Vassall-Fox, 3rd Baron Holland
 Vassal (disambiguation)
 Vassalli, a surname